Prionapteryx texturella is a moth in the family Crambidae. It is found in Madagascar and Tanzania (Zanzibar).

References

Ancylolomiini
Moths described in 1877